The Colorado Comets were an American soccer club based in Denver, Colorado founded in 1985 which later competed in the SISL and USISL.

History
Founded by Ed Eid in 1985, the team began as an amateur club coached by Kelvin Norman.  That year, they lost to the Mitre Eagles of Seattle, Washington in the semifinals of the National Amateur Indoor Championship.   In 1989, the Comets entered the Southwest Outdoor Soccer League, winning the championship that year. Eid coached the team, winning Coach of the Year honors and Norman was selected as the league MVP.   In October 1989, Norman returned to the position of head coach.  Despite winning three titles, the Comets began having financial difficulties in 1991.  In February 1992, Norman announced that the team would withdraw from the league.  The team reformed in 1998, playing in the USISL Premier Development Soccer League, a U.S. fourth division league.

Year-by-year

Head coaches
 Kelvin Norman (1985–1989)
 Ed Eid (1989)
 Kelvin Norma (1989–1992)
 Marc Francis (1998–1999, 2000)
 Merv Johnson (1999–2000)

References

External links
 Team Homepage

Soccer clubs in Denver
Soccer clubs in Colorado
USISL teams
Defunct Premier Development League teams
1985 establishments in Colorado
Association football clubs disestablished in 2000
Association football clubs established in 1985
2000 disestablishments in Colorado